The 1981 Men's South American Volleyball Championship, the 14th tournament, took place in 1981 in Santiago.

Final positions

Mens South American Volleyball Championship, 1981
Men's South American Volleyball Championships
1981 in South American sport
International volleyball competitions hosted by Chile 
1981 in Chilean sport